Clark Cromwell Haggans (born January 10, 1977) is a former American football outside linebacker. He was drafted by the Pittsburgh Steelers in the fifth round of the 2000 NFL Draft. He played college football at Colorado State as a defensive end. Haggans played in the National Football League (NFL) from 2000 through 2012, for the Pittsburgh Steelers, Arizona Cardinals, and San Francisco 49ers

Haggans earned a Super Bowl ring with the Steelers in Super Bowl XL against the Seattle Seahawks.

College career
Haggans played defensive end at Colorado State University. He was a productive pass rusher at Colorado State, where he walked on as a freshman, eventually earning a scholarship. He was a teammate of former Steelers teammate Joey Porter and former Cincinnati Bengals linebacker Adrian Ross.  Haggans holds the Colorado State all-time sack record to this day, with 33 sacks recorded. He was inducted into the Colorado State University Athletics Hall of Fame in 2015.

Professional career

Pittsburgh Steelers
The Steelers drafted Haggans out of the fifth round of the 2000 NFL Draft. He became a regular starter at left outside linebacker in 2004 when the team released long-time starter Jason Gildon.

Haggans recorded six quarterback sacks in 2004, and had nine sacks during the 2005 regular season. Haggans was second on the Steelers defense in tackles for Super Bowl XL, and also recorded a sack, helping the Steelers defeat the Seattle Seahawks. In 2008, Haggans became an unrestricted free agent.

Arizona Cardinals
On March 26, 2008, Haggans agreed to a one-year contract with the Arizona Cardinals. He was placed on injured reserve with a foot injury on December 19, ending his season. Without Haggans, the Cardinals would reach Super Bowl XLIII, but would lose to his old team, the Pittsburgh Steelers, 27-23.

An unrestricted free agent in the 2009 offseason, Haggans was re-signed to a three-year contract by the Cardinals on March 17.
In 2009, he would go on to register 74 tackles, 5 sacks, and 2 forced fumbles in 16 games played.  In 2010, he had 47 tackles, 5 sacks, and 1 forced fumble in 13 games.
In 2011, he reunited with Ray Horton who was hired as the new Arizona Cardinals defensive coordinator to implement the Pittsburgh Steelers style defense at Arizona.

He re-signed with the Cardinals on June 5, 2012, on a one-year deal.

San Francisco 49ers
On September 2, 2012, Haggans agreed to a one-year contract with the San Francisco 49ers. The 49ers finished the 2012 NFL Season with an 11-4-1 record and reached Super Bowl XLVII, but lost 34-31 to the Baltimore Ravens.

Personal life
He participated in football, basketball and track at Palos Verdes Peninsula High School in Southern California, earning three letters in each sport. During his freshman and sophomore years, Haggans was on football teams that went undefeated. In 1993 and 1994, he was named all-league as a tight end and defensive tackle, while also earning all-division honors. In 1994, Haggans helped lead PVPHS' varsity team to a league title. He has a son named Damon and a daughter named Alianna. He majored in art at Colorado State.

Charity
In 2012, Haggans became the first NFL player to support the Black Out Child Abuse Campaign. Black Out Child Abuse, Inc. is a 501(c)3 non-profit foundation, with offices in Westerville, OH, was founded in 2012 and serves families and organizations across the country; bringing education, assistance and support to those in need. Haggans wears blackout paint as opposed to the stick on in support of this cause.

References

External links
 San Francisco 49ers bio
 Arizona Cardinals bio

1977 births
Living people
American football defensive ends
American football outside linebackers
Colorado State Rams football players
Pittsburgh Steelers players
Players of American football from Torrance, California
Arizona Cardinals players
San Francisco 49ers players